The men's 4 x 100 metres relay at the 1974 European Athletics Championships was held in Rome, Italy, at Stadio Olimpico on 7 and 8 September 1974.

Medalists

Results

Final
8 September

Heats
7 September

Heat 1

Heat 2

Participation
According to an unofficial count, 52 athletes from 13 countries participated in the event.

 (4)
 (4)
 (4)
 (4)
 (4)
 (4)
 (4)
 (4)
 (4)
 (4)
 (4)
 (4)
 (4)

References

4 x 100 metres relay
Relays at the European Athletics Championships